Fatkhullo Dastamovich Fatkhulloyev (born 24 March 1990) is a Tajik professional footballer who plays as a winger for Bangladesh Premier League club Rahmatganj MFS and the Tajikistan national team.

Career

Club
Fatkhulloyev began his senior club career in Tajik club Dynamo Dushanbe, where he spent one season.

On 30 December 2017, Fatkhulloyev signed a one-year contract with Indonesian Liga 1 side Persela Lamongan, but was released by the club on 5 February 2018.

On 19 July 2019, Fatkhulloyev left FC Istiklol to join Uzbekistan Super League club FK Buxoro.

On 12 February 2020, Fatkhulloyev signed for FK Khujand.

Indian Super League
On 15 October 2020, Fatkhulloyev signed for Indian Super League club Chennaiyin FC on a one-year deal. He joined the club as their Asian quota player and made his league debut against Jamshedpur FC on 24 November. He scored his first goal against Kerala Blasters FC on 21 February 2021.

After leaving Chennaiyin, Fatkhulloyev signed for CSKA Pamir Dushanbe on 20 March 2021.

In January 2022, FC Abdysh-Ata Kant confirmed that the club signed a contract with Fatkhulloyev

Rahmatganj MFS
In November 2022, Fatkhulloyev signed for Rahmatganj MFS ahead of the 2022–23 season.

International
Fatkhulloyev represented Tajikistan in the 2007 FIFA U-17 World Cup, which was held in South Korea.

In 2007, he was called up in the national squad and he made his debut against Kazakhstan on 8 September, which ended 1–1. From 2007 to 2019, he played 68 international matches for Tajikistan scoring 9 goals.

Career statistics

Club

International

Statistics accurate as of match played 14 November 2018

International goals
Scores and results list Tajikistan's goal tally first.

Honours
Istiklol
Tajik League: 2010, 2011, 2014, 2015, 2016, 2017, 2018
Tajik Cup: 2009, 2010, 2013, 2014, 2016, 2018
Tajik Supercup: 2014, 2015, 2016, 2018, 2019
AFC President's Cup: 2012

Tajikistan
AFC Challenge Cup runner-up: 2008

References

External links

1990 births
Living people
Tajikistani footballers
Tajikistan international footballers
Tajikistan Higher League players
FC Istiklol players
Footballers at the 2014 Asian Games
Association football midfielders
Asian Games competitors for Tajikistan
Tajikistan youth international footballers